The Marvel Cinematic Universe (MCU) is a media franchise and shared fictional universe that is the setting of superhero television series based on characters that appear in Marvel Comics publications. Marvel Television released the first series in the universe, Agents of S.H.I.E.L.D., which began airing on ABC during the 2013–14 television season, and was joined by Agent Carter in the 2014–15 television season. Inhumans aired on ABC in the 2017–18 television season. Netflix's Marvel series began in 2015 with Daredevil and Jessica Jones, with Luke Cage releasing in 2016. Those series were followed by Iron Fist, the crossover miniseries The Defenders, and The Punisher in 2017. Additionally, the MCU expanded to Hulu with Runaways, also in 2017, and Helstrom in 2020, and expanded to Freeform with Cloak & Dagger in 2018. Marvel Studios—the production studio behind the MCU feature films—began releasing series in 2021 that feature greater interconnectivity with the films than these series.

Agents of S.H.I.E.L.D. is headlined by Clark Gregg in the role of Phil Coulson, while Hayley Atwell stars as Peggy Carter in Agent Carter, both reprising their roles from the MCU films. Anson Mount headlines Inhumans as Black Bolt. Charlie Cox is featured as Matt Murdock / Daredevil in Daredevil, while Krysten Ritter leads as Jessica Jones in Jessica Jones, which also introduces Mike Colter as Luke Cage, who later headlined Luke Cage. Finn Jones stars as Danny Rand / Iron Fist in Iron Fist and joins Cox, Ritter, and Colter in reprising their roles for The Defenders. Jon Bernthal stars as Frank Castle / Punisher in The Punisher, after being introduced in the second season of Daredevil. Runaways co-stars Rhenzy Feliz as Alex Wilder. Cloak & Dagger sees Olivia Holt and Aubrey Joseph as Tandy Bowen / Dagger and Tyrone Johnson / Cloak, respectively. Helstrom stars Tom Austen and Sydney Lemmon as Daimon and Ana Helstrom, respectively.

Due to the nature of the shared universe, several actors appear in the series as characters that had previously appeared in other mediums, including: Gregg, who appeared as Coulson in the films Iron Man, Iron Man 2, Thor, Marvel's The Avengers, and the short films The Consultant and A Funny Thing Happened on the Way to Thor's Hammer, before appearing in Agents of S.H.I.E.L.D.; and Atwell, who portrayed Carter in the films Captain America: The First Avenger and Captain America: The Winter Soldier and the short film Agent Carter, upon which the series of the same name is based, before appearing in Agents of S.H.I.E.L.D. as well. Atwell is the first actor to appear in multiple MCU television series with her role in Agent Carter. All characters that have made appearances in other MCU media, such as the digital series Marvel's Agents of S.H.I.E.L.D.: Slingshot, are noted.

ABC series

Netflix series

2015–2017

2018–2019

Young adult series

Adventure into Fear

Tom Austen and Sydney Lemmon headline Helstrom as Daimon and Ana Helstrom, respectively. Helstrom was intended to be the first series in the planned Adventure into Fear franchise, which was intended to feature Gabriel Luna reprising his Agents of S.H.I.E.L.D. role of Robbie Reyes / Ghost Rider in the canceled Ghost Rider series.

See also
 MCU television actors (Marvel Studios)
 Marvel One-Shots actors
 MCU film actors
 The Infinity Saga film actors
 Agents of S.H.I.E.L.D.: Slingshot actors

References

External links

 Full cast and crew for Marvel's Agents of S.H.I.E.L.D. at IMDb
 Full cast and crew for Marvel's Agent Carter at IMDb
 Full cast and crew for Marvel's Inhumans at IMDb
 Full cast and crew for Marvel's Runaways at IMDb
 Full cast and crew for Marvel's Cloak & Dagger at IMDb

 Full cast and crew for Marvel's Daredevil at IMDb
 Full cast and crew for Marvel's Jessica Jones at IMDb
 Full cast and crew for Marvel's Luke Cage at IMDb
 Full cast and crew for Marvel's Iron Fist at IMDb
 Full cast and crew for Marvel's The Defenders at IMDb
 Full cast and crew for Marvel's The Punisher at IMDb

Lists of actors by American television series
Lists of actors by crime television series
Lists of actors by drama television series
Lists of actors by science fiction television series
Lists of actors by superhero television series

Television series actors, Marvel Television